Gerhard Nik Progni (born 6 November 1986) is an Albanian professional footballer plays as a midfielder for SC Gjilani.

A product of FK Partizani Tirana, Progni has played for several clubs in Albania, including Skënderbeu, whom he won one Albanian Superliga title.

Club career

Early career
Progni began his career with Partizani as a child, where he played for the club's youth teams. During the 2004–05 season with Partizani's U-19 side, he won the national championship and caught the attention of the senior team, who invited him to train with them towards the end of the season. He was promoted from the U-19 side at the end of that season, and was loaned out to Albanian First Division side Kastrioti for the 2005–06 season in order to gain first team experience. During his year on loan, he became an integral part of the first team squad, and with his good performances and 3 league goals he even helped the club achieve promotion to the Albanian Superliga after a third-place finish.

FK Partizani Tirana
Following the successful loan period at Kastrioti, Progni returned to his parent club Partizani and signed a three-year contract with the club. During the 2006-07 campaign, he became an important first team player, making 29 league appearances and scoring 2 goals, helping his side finish 4th in the league as well as reaching the semi-finals of the Albanian Cup, where they narrowly lost to beaten finalists Teuta on away goals. The following season, he played for Partizani until January, making 11 league appearances, before leaving the club for Besa Kavajë.

KF Besa Kavajë 
Porgni signed for Besa in January 2008, and immediately became an important member of the first team, making 16 league appearances and scoring 1 goal, helping the club finish third in the league (behind his previous team Partizani). He also scored a goal in the Albanian Cup with Besa, where the club reached the quarter-finals. 

The following season Porgni remained in Kavajë, and made his European debut in the Intertoto Cup against Cypriot club Ethnikos Achna, where he was in the starting lineup for both legs, helping Besa to a 1–1 aggregate win on an away goal. In the next round his side faced Swiss outfit Grasshopper Club Zürich, who beat Besa 5–1 on aggregate, with Progni playing the full 90 minutes in both games. Domestically, Besa did not have a successful season, finishing 7th in the league, just 2 places above the relegation play-off spots. Progni did however have a successful individual season, scoring 4 league goals in 28 games, and scoring 3 goals in 6 cup games.

Dinamo Tirana
Progni left Besa Kavajë at the end of the 2008–09 season and joined Dinamo Tirana in the summer transfer window. At Dinamo he had a difficult time attempting to break into the first team, as the squad had an array of talent in the midfield positions, including Emiljano Vila and Elis Bakaj, meaning Progni's chances were limited. He left the club in January and made just 5 league appearances during his short time at Dinamo, all of which were substitute appearances. His only goal for the club came in the Albanian Cup against Adriatiku.

Flamurtari FC
After a less than fruitful short spell with Dinamo Tirana, Progni joined Flamurtari FC in January 2010 and immediately became an integral player, starting 16 league games in the second half of the season. In 2011, Progni rcontinued as a starter, scoring 6 goals in 30 league games, helping Flamurtari achieve a 2nd place finish in the Albanian Superliga. At the end of the 2011 season, he went on trial with Romanian Liga I champions FC Oțelul Galați, accompanied by fellow Albanian and former ASC Oțelul Galați player, Arben Kokalari. His trial at the club was not successful, so he remained at Flamurtari for the following 2011–12 campaign. He featured in both Europa League games against Baumit Jablonec in the second qualifying round, which ended in a 7–1 aggregate loss for Flamurtari. In the league campaign, Progni played in 28 league games and scored 8 goals, helping Flamurtari finish 4th in the Albanian Superliga. In the cup, Progni featured in 12 games and scored 1 goal as Flamurtari reached the semi-finals, losing out to eventual winners Tirana.

FK Kukësi
Progni signed for newly promoted side FK Kukësi in the summer of 2012, who under the guidance of the club president Safet Gjici had an ambitious project to be one of the best clubs in the country.

In October 2013, the club captain Rrahman Hallaçi gave up his duties, making Progni the club's captain for the remainder of the season.

KF Skënderbeu Korce
On 10 June 2014, reigning Albanian champions for the past four seasons KF Skënderbeu Korce announced the signing of Progni from FK Kukësi on a one-year contract. He was considered to be the replacement of Gjergji Muzaka, who had left the club in favour of a return to one of Progni's former sides, Flamurtari.

On 5 August 2015, in the returning match of the Third qualifying round of 2015–16 UEFA Champions League against Milsami Orhei, Progni scored the second goal of the match in the 55th minute to help the team to win the match at Elbasan Arena 2–0 and to qualify in Play-off round with the aggregate 4–0.

Zira FK
On 23 June 2016, Progni moved abroad for the first time by signing a two-year contract with Zira FK of Azerbaijan Premier League. Six months later, Progni left Zira by mutual consent on 9 January 2017.

KF Teuta Durrës 
On 23 January 2017, Progni returned to Albanian Superliga by signing a six-month contract with Teuta, taking the squad number 77. In an interview two days later, he said he returned to Albania to stay closer to his family. He made his debut on 29 January against Tirana at home, contributing in a 1–0 win in the team's first competitive match of 2017.

During the second part of 2016–17 season, Progni contributed with 15 league matches, scoring 2 times, including the winner against Vllaznia in the penultimate matchday which assured Teuta another season in the top flight. He also played 4 matches and scored once in team's unsuccessful run in the Albanian Cup, which ended at the hands of Skënderbeu. Following the end of the season, Progni's contract expired and he became a free agent.

Return to Partizani
On 14 June 2017, Progni completed a transfer to Partizani, returning to his first club after nine years. He was presented the same day where he penned a two-year contract with an option of a further one and was allocated squad number 77, the same he held during his last season with Teuta.

Progni started the domestic season on 10 September by playing full-90 minutes in the opening championship match versus Laçi, ended in a 0–2 loss. Progni was given a new role under Italian manager Mark Iuliano, playing as a right-back in the 4–3–3 lineup. Progni's first score-sheet contributions came later on 20 November by netting the second of the 2–1 win at Kukësi. 

In January 2018, Progni switched his kit number from 77 to his preferred 7, last worn by the departed Realdo Fili. He wore the number 7 for the first time on 31 January, in the cup match against former club Flamurtari. Progni finished the 2017–18 season as Partizani's top scorer with 9 goals, including 8 in league, his highest tally since the 2011–12 season.

In July 2018, he played in both matches of 2018–19 UEFA Europa League first qualifying round against NK Maribor, unable to avoid the elimination. Progni left the club in a surprise move on 30 August, after having collected 43 matches and scoring 9 goals in all competitions. Partizani Tirana terminated the player's contract by mutual consent due to being more focused on youngster players, while Progni's place in the starting lineup was not secure after collecting only 86 minutes in the first two league matches. Manager Skënder Gega, speaking on Progni's departure, stated that the player was in his plans, but he [Progni] left with the aim of a new challenge.

Return to Teuta
On 31 August 2018, Progni was presented as Teuta s' newest player, signing a contract until the end of the season and taking squad number 11.

SC Gjilani
On 26 July 2019, Progni joined SC Gjilani.

International career
Progni has presented Albania at youth level, making 3 appearances for under-19 side and 10 for under-21.

Career statistics

Club

Honours
Skënderbeu Korçë
 Albanian Superliga: 2014–15
 Albanian Supercup: 2014

References

External links

1986 births
Living people
People from Tropojë
Albanian footballers
Albania under-21 international footballers
Albania youth international footballers
Association football midfielders
FK Partizani Tirana players
Besa Kavajë players
FK Dinamo Tirana players
Flamurtari Vlorë players
FK Kukësi players
KF Skënderbeu Korçë players
Zira FK players
KF Teuta Durrës players
SC Gjilani players
Kategoria Superiore players
Kategoria e Parë players
Azerbaijan Premier League players
Football Superleague of Kosovo players
Albanian expatriate footballers
Expatriate footballers in Azerbaijan
Albanian expatriate sportspeople in Azerbaijan
Expatriate footballers in Kosovo
Albanian expatriate sportspeople in Kosovo